Pinta  may refer to:

 Pinta (ship), used by Christopher Columbus
 Pinta (yacht), yachts owned by Willi Illbruck
 Pinta (disease), a skin disease caused by Treponema carateum
 Pinta Island (also known as Abington Island) in the Galapagos Islands
 Pinta (software), a Paint.NET-like image drawing and editing program
 Pinta, slang for pint of milk after the Drinka pinta milka day advertising slogan

See also 
 Pint, unit of measurement
 Pinto (disambiguation)

ar:بنتا (توضيح)